Gangcheng is one of 10 urban districts of the prefecture-level city of Jinan, the capital of Shandong Province, East China.

It is named for its production of iron and steel. (Gang "钢" means "steel" in Chinese.) Laiwu Steel Corporation, the largest subsidiary of Shandong Iron and Steel Group (commonly known as Shan Steel), is headquartered in Gangcheng District.

In January 2019, the Shandong provincial government announced in a decision that Laiwu Prefecture-level city was absorbed by Jinan and Gangcheng District will also be under Jinan's administration.

Administrative divisions
As 2012, Gangcheng District is divided to 1 subdistrict and 4 towns.
Subdistricts
Aishan Subdistrict

Towns

References

External links 
 Information page

County-level divisions of Shandong
Jinan